The Zizin (in its upper course also: Dobromir) is a right tributary of the river Tărlung in Romania. It flows into the Tărlung in Budila.

References

Rivers of Romania
Rivers of Brașov County